Richard Howard Stallings (born October 7, 1940) is an American politician who served as a member of the United States House of Representatives for Idaho's 2nd congressional district from 1985 to 1993.

Early life and education
Richard Stallings was born in Ogden, Utah to Howard and Elizabeth (née Austin) Stallings in 1940. Richard was raised in Ogden along with his younger sister, Marilyn. He grew up active in Scouting, earning the rank of Eagle Scout at age 16, and a year later the Silver Award. Stallings is a graduate of the Ben Lomond High School class of 1958. He served as a missionary for the Church of Jesus Christ of Latter-day Saints in New Zealand from 1960 to 1962. He earned a Bachelor of Science in history and political science from Weber State College, then went on to earn a Master of Science in history from Utah State University, having fulfilled a portion of his Master's studies at Colorado College.

Career
Stallings taught history at Ricks College in Rexburg, Idaho from 1969 until his election to Congress in 1984.

U.S. House of Representatives 
Idaho Democrats nominated Stallings to challenge four-term Republican incumbent George Hansen in 1982, but he lost in the general election. In 1984, after Hansen was censured by the House of Representatives, Stallings defeated him in a hotly contested race by fewer than 200 votes.
 Despite representing a heavily Republican district, Stallings was re-elected three times.

A conservative Democrat, Stallings unexpectedly received three votes for the presidential nomination from anti-abortion delegates at the 1988 Democratic National Convention.

Senate campaign

Stallings was the Democratic nominee in 1992 for an open seat in the United States Senate, but lost to Dirk Kempthorne, the popular two-term mayor of Boise.

Clinton administration 
In 1993, Stallings was appointed United States Nuclear Waste Negotiator by President Bill Clinton and served in that capacity until the office was eliminated in early 1995.

Later career 
Stallings attempted to win his old House seat back in 1998, but was defeated by state house Speaker Mike Simpson of Blackfoot in the general election. The seat was open, as three-term incumbent Mike Crapo successfully ran for an open seat in the U.S. Senate.

After leaving Congress, Stallings later served as executive director of the Pocatello Neighborhood Housing Services and later on the Pocatello, Idaho, City Council from 2001 to December 20, 2007.

Idaho Democratic Party Chair 
In 2005, Stallings won election as chairman of the Idaho Democratic Party. Stallings was re-elected state Democratic chair in 2007. Stallings resigned on December 20, 2007.

2014 congressional campaign

On March 14, 2014, Stallings filed to run as the Democratic candidate for his old U.S. House seat in Idaho's Second Congressional District. He was the Democratic nominee after the uncontested primary election, but was defeated by Simpson in the general election.

Personal life 
Stallings and his first wife, Ranae Garner, met while classmates at Weber State College. The couple were married in 1963 in the Salt Lake Temple in a ceremony officiated by Spencer W. Kimball.

References

External links
 Richard Stallings for Congress
 

 Idaho State University Library – Richard H. Stallings, papers 1984–1995

 

1940 births
20th-century Mormon missionaries
American Mormon missionaries in New Zealand
20th-century American politicians
Brigham Young University–Idaho faculty
Idaho city council members
Living people
People from Ogden, Utah
People from Pocatello, Idaho
Utah State University alumni
Colorado College alumni
Weber State University alumni
Democratic Party members of the United States House of Representatives from Idaho
Politicians from Ogden, Utah
Latter Day Saints from Utah
Latter Day Saints from Idaho
Latter Day Saints from Colorado